Michael Joseph John Berry Jr. (born 1964) is a British actor, best known for portraying the Irish sailor Twigg in Pirates of the Caribbean: The Curse of the Black Pearl.

Career
Berry is known for portraying supporting characters in well known films such as the man who kidnapped Julia Meade in Mission: Impossible III, the Romulan Tactical Officer in Star Trek, Bernard the Bull in Where the Wild Things Are, William in 13, the Russian mobster Vladi in The Hangover Part II and Silverlake Passerby in Ruby Sparks.

Berry is also a writer for numerous television shows and plays such as Spiderman and the Rope.

Personal life
Berry resides in Los Angeles as of 2013.

Filmography

Film

Television

References

External links
 

1964 births
Living people
20th-century English male actors
21st-century English male actors
English expatriates in the United States 
English male film actors
English male television actors
Male actors from Oxfordshire
actors from Oxford